Salvatore J. Panto, Jr. is an American politician from Pennsylvania who is the current mayor of Easton, Pennsylvania and has served for six non-consecutive terms. First for two terms from 1984-1992, and another four terms from 2008 to present.

Early life

Panto is a Easton native. He received a Bachelor's degree from Kutztown University of Pennsylvania and a Master's degree from Lehigh University. In 2011 he was awarded an Honorary Doctorate in Public service from Lafayette College.

Political career

First tenure

Panto was elected mayor at the age of 31 in 1998 making him the youngest mayor in Easton's history. During his first tenure he focuses on making the city cleaner and safer. He expanded the city's police and fire department and hired code enforcement officers.

Second tenure

When he returned to the office of mayor the city of Easton was on the verge of filing for Act 47, the municipal equivalent of bankruptcy. However, Panto was able to re-organize city finances to create a surplus budget every year during his second tenure without increasing the real estate tax. An advocate for public parks, Panto has greatly expanded the city's park network and also improved their safety and cleanliness ending rampant drug dealing and gang violence, and cleaning dangerous trash. In 2017 he received a $850,000 subsidy from the Pennsylvania Department of Conservation and Natural Resources to improve the National Canal Museum and the 520 acre park next to it.

Panto has also served as the President of the Pennsylvania Municipal League and during his tenure advocated for increased state spending to renovate storm drains in rural and underfunded municipalities and opposed PA house bill 1069 which would require the posting of an agenda 24 hours before board meetings, and for the board meetings only act on topics on the agenda.

In 2019 Panto became the center of a municipal spending debate. City Councilmen Peter Melan proposed slashing the city councilor's salary in half due to Mayor's salary doubling. The other members of the city council refused to decrease their own payroll and Melan has announced his candidacy for mayor in 2023 hoping to defeat Panto in the Democratic Primary.

Panto has also been criticized for his mismanagement of the COVID-19 pandemic during which he shut down the city hall and had all municipal duties preformed over video call. This online municipal government system, combined with a $6,000,000 shortfall in the city's budget due to a near total loss of the city's tourism revenue for the nearby casino and the Crayola Experience, resulted in difficulty in Panto re-hiring city employees and a large decrease in his popular support. Panto was able to salvage the situation by slashing the city's taxes resulting in a large influx of New Yorkers moving to the city to avoid New York City's cost of living and earning the city the moniker "little Manhattan."

Panto has also received criticism for proposing removing the term "Easter" from the city's annual Easter egg hunt in 2022, but backed down after backlash from local churches and citizens. He has also received criticism for publicly cursing out a local African American bar owner at a Town hall meeting after the bar owner complained that the city has done nothing to compensate for his wife being hit by a city owned advertisement screen during a storm and that the city would've done something if she where white. Panto responded by repeatedly shouting profanities at the owner. He has since apologized for his language, but defends his actions of defending his integrity against racism accusations.

Electoral history

References

Living people
Mayors of Easton, Pennsylvania
Pennsylvania Democrats
Kutztown University of Pennsylvania alumni
Lehigh University alumni
1953 births